Red River Parish (French: Paroisse de la Rivière-Rouge) is a parish located in the U.S. state of Louisiana. As of the 2020 census, the population was 7,620, making it the fourth-least populous parish in Louisiana. Its seat is Coushatta. It is one of the newer parishes, created in 1871 by the state legislature from parts of Bienville, Bossier, Caddo, Desoto and Natchitoches Parishes under Reconstruction. The plantation economy was based on cotton cultivation, highly dependent on enslaved African labor before the American Civil War.

In 1880, the parish had a population with more than twice as many blacks as whites.  They were essentially disenfranchised in 1898 under a new state constitution after the white Democrats regained power in the state in the late 1870s through paramilitary intimidation at the polls. Most of the former slaves worked as sharecroppers and laborers, cultivating cotton. Because of the mechanization of agriculture, many blacks left the parish during the mid-20th century Great Migration to seek better job opportunities elsewhere.  By 2000, the parish population was 9,622, with a white majority, but Coushatta itself was still two thirds black.

History

As in many other rural areas, Red River Parish and the Red River Valley were areas of white vigilante and paramilitary violence after the Civil War, as insurgents tried to regain power after the South's defeat. The state legislature during Reconstruction created the parish in 1871, one of a number established to develop Republican Party strength.

Marshall H. Twitchell was a Union veteran who moved to the parish from Vermont and married a local woman.  With the help of her family, he became a successful cotton planter and local leader. He was elected in 1870 as a Republican to the state legislature and filled four local offices with his brother and three brothers-in-law, the latter native to the parish.  He won support from freedmen by appointing some to local offices and promoting education. The unpublished dissertation, Carpetbagger Extraordinary: Marshall Harvey Twitchell, 1840-1905 by the historian Jimmy G. Shoalmire studies Twitchell's life within the context of the social unrest in Red River Parish at the time.

During the 1870s, there were regular outbreaks of violence in Louisiana, despite the presence of two thousand federal troops stationed there.  The extended agricultural depression and poor economy of the late 19th century aggravated social tensions, as both freedmen and whites struggled to survive and to manage new labor arrangements.

The disputed gubernatorial election of 1872 increased political tensions in the state, especially as the outcome was unsettled for months.  Both the Democratic Party and Republican candidates certified their own slates of local officers.  Established in May 1874 from white militias, the White League was formed first in the Red River Valley in nearby Grant Parish. The organization grew increasingly well-organized in rural areas like Red River Parish. Soon White League chapters rose across the state.  Operating openly, the White League used violence against officeholders, running some out of town and killing others, and suppressed election turnout among black and white Republicans.

In August 1874 the White League forced six white Republicans from office in Coushatta and ordered them to leave the state. Members assassinated them before they left Louisiana. Four of the men murdered were the brother and three brothers-in-law of state Senator Marshall Twitchell. The White League also killed five to twenty freedmen who had accompanied the Twitchell relatives and were witnesses to the vigilante acts.

Historians came to call the events the Coushatta Massacre. The murders contributed to Republican Governor William Pitt Kellogg's request to President Grant for more Federal troops to help control the state. Ordinary Southerners wrote to President Grant at the White House describing the terrible conditions of violence and fear they lived under during these times.

With increased voter fraud, paramilitary violence against Republican blacks and whites, and intimidation at the polls preventing people from voting, white Democrats regained control of the state legislature in 1876. The population of the parish in 1880 was 8,573, of whom 2,506 were whites and 6,007 were blacks.  In 1898 the state achieved disfranchisement of most blacks and many poor whites through a new constitution that created numerous barriers to voter registration.

20th century
To seek better opportunities and escape the oppression of segregation, underfunded education, and disfranchisement, thousands of African Americans left Red River and other rural parishes in the Great Migration north and west. As may be seen in the census table below, most left from 1940 to 1970, when the parish had steep population decreases.   Regional agricultural problems contributed to outmigration, especially after increasing mechanization in the 1930s reduced the need for laborers. At this time many African Americans from Louisiana went to California, where the defense industry associated with World War II was growing and workers were needed.

Additional outmigration from the parish occurred as late as the 1980s, when African Americans from Louisiana migrated within the South to jobs in developing metropolitan areas of New South states.

Red River Parish has been a Democratic Party stronghold since the party reestablished dominance in 1876. As in other southern states, recent decades have brought a realignment in politics in Presidential elections, with the conservative white majority of the parish voting for Republican U.S. President George W. Bush in his 2004 reelection.  The majority of the parish voters, however, has continued to support Democratic candidates at the state and local level.

Red River was one of only three parishes that did not vote for the Republican gubernatorial candidate, U.S. Representative Bobby Jindal in the October 20, 2007, jungle primary.  The others were nearby Bienville and St. Bernard, located southeast of New Orleans.

Despite its Democratic heritage, Red River Parish is represented in the Louisiana State Senate by a Republican, Gerald Long, the only member of the Long dynasty not to have been elected to office as a Democrat. Long defeated the Democratic candidate, Thomas Taylor Townsend, in the 2007 nonpartisan blanket primary. Both candidates came from Natchitoches.

Louisiana was the last state to issue same-sex marriage licenses in 2015 after a landmark Supreme Court decision to allow same-sex marriage in all 50 U.S. states. Red River Parish was the final holdout of Louisiana's 64 parishes when it continued to deny marriage licenses after 63 other parishes began doing so in late June 2015. Parish Clerk of Court Stuart Shaw was the only official besides Governor Bobby Jindal to continue to defy the Supreme Court's ruling even after the Clerks of Court Association reversed their "wait and see" position.

Geography

Loggy Bayou flows south from Lake Bistineau, traverses Bienville Parish, and in Red River Parish joins the Red River.

Major highways

U.S.
  U.S. Highway 71
  U.S. Highway 84
  U.S. Highway 371
  Louisiana Highway 1
  Louisiana Highway 174
  Louisiana Highway 480

Adjacent parishes
 Caddo Parish  (northwest)
 Bossier Parish  (north)
 Bienville Parish  (northeast)
 Natchitoches Parish  (southeast)
 De Soto Parish  (west)

National protected area
 Red River National Wildlife Refuge (part)

Climate

According to the Köppen Climate Classification system, Red River Parish has a humid subtropical climate, abbreviated "Cfa" on climate maps.

Demographics

2020 census

As of the 2020 United States census, there were 7,620 people, 3,372 households, and 1,984 families residing in the parish.

2010 census
As of the 2010 United States Census, there were 9,091 people living in the parish. 59.0% were White, 39.5% Black or African American, 0.4% Native American, 0.1% Asian, 0.3% of some other race and 0.6% of two or more races. 1.1% were Hispanic or Latino (of any race).

2000 census
As of the census of 2000, there were 9,622 people, 3,414 households, and 2,526 families living in the parish. There were 3,988 housing units at an average density of 10 per square mile (4/km2). The racial makeup of the parish was 57.87% White, 40.91% Black or African American, 0.28% Native American, 0.09% Asian, 0.02% Pacific Islander, 0.22% from other races, and 0.61% from two or more races.  1.01% of the population were Hispanic or Latino of any race.

There were 3,414 households, out of which 35.70% had children under the age of 18 living with them, 51.50% were married couples living together, 18.60% had a female householder with no husband present, and 26.00% were non-families. Individuals made up 23.10% of all households, and 11.50% had someone living alone who was 65 years of age or older.  The average household size was 2.74 and the average family size was 3.23.

In the parish the population was spread out, with 30.10% under the age of 18, 9.30% from 18 to 24, 24.80% from 25 to 44, 21.50% from 45 to 64, and 14.40% who were 65 years of age or older.  The median age was 35 years. For every 100 females there were 90.80 males.  For every 100 females age 18 and over, there were 85.40 males.

The median income for a household in the parish was $23,153, and the median income for a family was $27,870. Males had a median income of $27,132 versus $17,760 for females. The per capita income for the parish was $12,119.  About 26.00% of families and 29.90% of the population were below the poverty line, including 40.10% of those under age 18 and 18.90% of those age 65 or over.

Education
Public schools in Red River Parish are operated by the Red River Parish School District.

It is in the service area of Bossier Parish Community College.

Government 
Red River Parish is governed by the Red River Parish Police Jury, which is divided into seven districts. District 1 is represented by William Brown, District 2 by Brandon Hillman, District 3 by Shawn Beard, District 4 by Jessie Davis, District 5 by John W. Moore, District 6 by Ben Taylor, and District 7 by Tray Murray. Red River Parish is represented in the Louisiana State Senate by Republican Louie Bernard of District 31. In the Louisiana House of Representatives, the parish is represented by Republican Michael Firment of District 22 and Democrat Kenny R. Cox of District 23. In the United States House of Representatives, it is represented by Republican Mike Johnson of Louisiana's 4th congressional district.

National Guard
Coushatta is the home of C Troop 2-108th Cavalry Squadron, a unit dating back to the Confederate Army during the Civil War under the nickname "the Wildbunch".  This unit was formerly known as A Company 1-156 Armor Battalion and served recently in Iraq during 2004-5 under the 256th Infantry Brigade. This unit just returned from its second deployment to Iraq in 2010.

Communities

Town 
 Coushatta (parish seat and largest municipality)

Villages 

 Edgefield (smallest municipality)
 Hall Summit
 Martin

Unincorporated communities 
 Crichton
 East Point
 Fairview Alpha
 Grand Bayou
 Hanna
 Harmon
 Lake End

Hospital

Christus Coushatta Health Care Center is the only hospital in Red River Parish.

Prison

Notable people
 Henry Bethard, member of the Louisiana House of Representatives from Red River Parish, 1960–1964; former Coushatta town attorney
 Edgar Cason, businessman and philanthropist
 Jack Crichton, Texas oil and gas industrialist, was born in Crichton, in Red River Parish.
 Andrew R. Johnson, former state senator (1916–1924) and mayor of Homer in Claiborne Parish, is interred in Red River Parish at Springville Cemetery in Coushatta.
 James M. McLemore, cattleman in Alexandria, two-time state gubernatorial candidate; Red River Parish native interred at Springville Cemetery
 Denver Moore, a long-time homeless ex-convict who gained fame when he and friend Ron Hall, a Dallas art dealer, co-wrote the story of their unlikely friendship in the best-seller and subsequent film, Same Kind of Different as Me  
 S. M. Morgan, Jr., member of the Louisiana House of Representatives from 1964 to 1968; the last House member to represent only Red River Parish
 Benjamin Milam Teekell, state representative from Red River Parish from 1920 to 1928; member of the Red River Parish School Board prior to 1920
 Lester Vetter, mayor of Coushatta from 1948 to 1952 and state representative from Red River Parish from 1952 until his death in office in 1960
 Lloyd F. Wheat, attorney and member of the Louisiana State Senate from Red River and Natchitoches parishes from 1948 to 1952
 W. Scott Wilkinson, Shreveport attorney and member of the Louisiana House of Representatives from 1920 to 1924

Politics

See also

 National Register of Historic Places listings in Red River Parish, Louisiana

References

 
Louisiana parishes
1871 establishments in Louisiana
Populated places established in 1871
Red River of the South